Opisthotropis typica, the olive mountain keelback, is a species of natricine snake found in the Philippines,
Indonesia, and Malaysia.

References

Opisthotropis
Reptiles described in 1890
Reptiles of the Philippines
Reptiles of Indonesia
Reptiles of Malaysia
Taxa named by François Mocquard
Reptiles of Borneo